Perm District is an administrative district (raion), one of the thirty-three in Perm Krai, Russia. Population - 116,353 (2021)

Geography 
The Perm district is located in the suburban area of Perm. It borders on Krasnokamsk municipality, Dobryansk municipality, Chusovskoy municipality, Kungur municipal district, Okhansk municipality as well as Nytvensk municipality along the river Kama. The district has 17 rural settlements comprising 223 communities.

The area of the district is 3753.05 km2.

History 
Perm uyezd was one of the 16 constituent districts of Perm province, formed by the manifesto of Catherine the Great in 1775.

Kultaevski district (administrative centre is Kultaevo village) was formed as a part of Perm district of Uralian region in December 1923. In December 1924 administrative centre of the district was moved to Verkhniye Mulli village.

Kultaevo district (at the initiative of the population) was renamed into Kalininskiy district in December 1925.

The Kalininsky district was united with the Motovilikhinsky district into one Kalininsky district with the centre in the town of Perm in October 1927 (the All-Russian Central Executive Committee decision of 14.10.1927).

In 1931 Kalininsky district was united with a part of liquidated Leninsky (Grigoryevsky), Yugovsky and South-Osokinsky districts into one Perm district with the centre in Perm (administrated by the city council).

On March 26, 1939, there was a decree of the Presidium of the Supreme Soviet of RSFSR on the formation of Verkhne-Mullinsky district, later renamed to Perm district. It included 94 collective farms, 5 state farms, 5 industrial collective farms, 2 machine-tractor stations.

Economy 
Location in the suburban area of the regional centre gives specific character to the farms: dairy and vegetable, egg and poultry production. Well-known enterprises include the Verkhnemullinsky livestock breeding farm, the Russian agricultural holding company and State Horse Breeding Farm. All of them have been liquidated due to bankruptcy.

Transport 
The Trans-Siberian Railway and "Perm-Yekaterinburg" line pass through the raion. The boundaries of the area are washed by the waters of two reservoirs, the Kama and the Votkinsk. In summer the Yugo-Kamski-Okhansk and Mostovaya-Nasadka ferries operate. In the Perm District is the "air gate" of Perm International Airport Bolshoye Savino (18 km from the city centre of Perm).

There are two major oil and gas pipelines of Russian and international importance running through the Perm District: Surgut-Polotsk and Urengoy-Centre.

Administrative and municipal status
Within the framework of administrative divisions, Permsky District is one of the thirty-three in the krai. The city of Perm serves as its administrative center, despite being incorporated separately as a city of krai significance—an administrative unit with the status equal to that of the districts.

As a municipal division, the district is incorporated as Permsky Municipal District. The city of krai significance of Perm is incorporated separately from the district as Perm Urban Okrug.

Notable residents 

Ilya Berezin (1818–1896), Orientalist, born in the settlement of Yug
Fyodor Panayev (1856–1933), teacher and climatologist, born in Yug

See also
Alebastrovo
Zaborye
Zagrishinskoye
Zavedeniye
Zaykovo

References

Notes

Sources



Districts of Perm Krai
States and territories established in 1939